The Gospel Oak to Barking line (sometimes unofficially called the Goblin) is a railway line in London. The line is part of Network Rail Strategic Route 6, and is classified as a London and South East Commuter line.

For much of its existence the line has played a minor role in London's transport system; however in recent years it has received significant investment to increase its capacity, including full 25kV AC overhead electrification, completed in 2018. At the eastern end of the line, the extension to the Barking Riverside regeneration site opened on 18 July 2022.

History

Original lines 
The line is mostly an amalgamation of lines built in the 19th century. The main section, between South Tottenham and Woodgrange Park, was built as the Tottenham and Forest Gate Railway, a joint project between the Midland Railway and the London, Tilbury and Southend Railway. This opened on 9 July 1894, linking the Midland and Great Eastern joint line at South Tottenham and the Forest Gate and Barking line at Woodgrange Park. The section west of South Tottenham was built as the Tottenham and Hampstead Junction Railway, which opened in 1868 but had not been commercially successful as a stand-alone railway.

Predecessor routes 
Although the route between Upper Holloway and Woodgrange Park has been constant, several stations have been the ends of the line. East Ham was an alternative eastern terminus for some time. Some trains were extended beyond Barking to destinations such as Southend and Tilbury. There was a regular boat train service between St Pancras and Tilbury.

A connection to Gospel Oak was added in 1888, but the routes via Kentish Town remained the primary ones and the Gospel Oak branch was abandoned in 1926. The connection to East Ham was abandoned in 1958.

The Tottenham and Hampstead Junction Railway section of the line had stations that were closed due to  proximity to other stations or for other reasons. These include Highgate Road (closed 1918), Junction Road (closed 1943), Hornsey Road (closed 1943) and St Ann's Road (closed 1942).

The line was considered for closure to passengers in 1963 as part of the Beeching Axe, but local users protested and formed an action group to prevent closure. Beeching's proposals for London were not implemented for the most part, and the line remained open. Even so, it was allowed to fall into a poor state of repair and reliability, and by 1980 had been cut back to an hourly service between Kentish Town and Barking. The station canopies were gradually demolished, ticket offices closed and staff withdrawn from stations.

New link to Gospel Oak 
A new link to Gospel Oak was built and the hourly service from Kentish Town was replaced by the current route from Gospel Oak with two trains per hour. The service remained very unreliable due to the age of the trains, which were initially Class 115 and 108 units, replaced in the early 1990s by class 117 and 121 units.

Private operators 

Initially part of British Rail Network SouthEast, the line was privatised in 1994, the track being owned by Railtrack (subsequently Network Rail) with the passenger service provided by the North London Railways franchise. This passed to National Express in 1997, which operated the line under the brand name Silverlink until November 2007. Under Silverlink, the slam door trains were replaced by Class 150 units in 2000, which improved reliability significantly. There were minor improvements in station facilities (such as CCTV and information points) but no major investment to upgrade the line and boost capacity, and the stations remained unstaffed.

London Overground 

Many lines within London were running at full capacity, and as a consequence the line took on a new strategic significance as a by-pass, relieving load on other lines by allowing passengers to travel between north and east London directly.

The Railways Act 2005 abolished the franchise and gave the operation of passenger services to Transport for London (TfL). In 2005, TfL started funding a small number of additional peak time and late evening services to relieve the worst overcrowding.

TfL took full control in November 2007 introducing improved late night and weekend services, and staff, ticket machines and Oyster equipment at all stations. The frequency was increased to three trains per hour during morning and afternoon peaks and the line was included on the Tube map for the first time.

The line was closed throughout most of September 2008 for upgrade work carried out by Network Rail. Capacity was increased from six trains per hour to eight (four each for passenger and goods trains). By replacing the overbridges carrying Sussex Way and Albert Road, and lowering the track in some other locations, it was made possible for W10 loading gauge goods trains to operate. Electrification was not included.

In 2010 eight new Class 172 Turbostar diesel trains replaced the Class 150 units, with two 23-metre coaches and the option to introduce a third coach.
The service frequency was increased to four trains per hour in January 2011.

Given the completion of electrification in 2018, new electric Class 710 trains were supposed to run from March 2018. The delivery of the trains was delayed by the manufacturer however and it was not known at that time when these units would enter service.

Due to the class 172 units being needed by West Midlands Trains, three Class 378 units (378 206, 378 209 and 378 232) were moved from other parts of the London Overground and shortened down from five to four carriages to provide an interim service until the class 710 units entered service. However, 6 trains are needed to be able to run a full service, so from 15 March 2019 (the day the last class 172 units left London Overground) the frequency on the line was halved to two trains per hour.

On 23 May 2019 the first two class 710 units entered service but the existing two trains per hour service was maintained until the full timetable was restored in June of that year. All eight of the new class 710 units were deployed by August 2019, with TfL offering a month's free travel to compensate passengers.

Electrification 

In 2008, electrification was ruled out on grounds of cost and difficulty of electrifying a line with so many viaducts and bridges, but the Network Route Utilisation Strategy published by Network Rail in October 2009 showed a benefit–cost ratio for the scheme of 2.4:1. In 2012, the Mayor of London, Boris Johnson, indicated that funding was "a matter for the Department for Transport".

In 2011, Network Rail proposed electrification in Control Period 5 (CP5), but in July 2012 Justine Greening, the Secretary of State for Transport, stated that electrification was not included in the High Level Output Specification for CP5, and that any funds would need to be provided by TfL. In August, the Mayor wrote to the Secretary of State for Transport to seek a way forward, and "she committed her officials to support work with TfL, Network Rail, train operators and other industry parties to see if a viable way can be found to bridge the funding gap."

In November 2012, the magazine Modern Railways reported that the Department for Transport had ruled out the work on the basis of an estimated cost of £90 million, in contrast to an estimate of £40M by TfL.

It was announced in June 2013 that £115M of funding for electrification was being made available as part of upgrades to rail infrastructure included in the government's 2013 spending round. At the same time Transport for London announced that they had obtained a £90M commitment from the Chancellor of the Exchequer and the Secretary of State for Transport.

In September 2015, Network Rail awarded the £56.9M contract to electrify the line to J. Murphy & Sons. There were part closures (at weekends and from South Tottenham to Barking) from June to late September 2016, followed by a full closure from October 2016 to February 2017. In February 2017, Network Rail announced that whilst the line would re-open as scheduled, they were not able to complete all the work planned due to "incorrect" designs and late delivery of materials. Further evening and weekend works until late June 2017 were already planned, followed by around four months of commissioning work before the electric wires could be turned on so that Class 710 trains could run. Although the line was completely electrified by mid-January 2018, delays prevented the introduction of new electric trains until 2019.

The line was electrified using the NR Series 2 OLE (Overhead Line Equipment) range.

Longer trains 

Increases in passenger numbers led to severe overcrowding at peak times, but it was not possible to increase peak frequencies without reducing the number of goods trains, as the line could accommodate only eight trains per hour in each direction. The two-coach Class 172 diesel trains in use between 2010 and 2019 were incapable of handling the increased number of passengers experienced after the incorporation into the London Overground. Between 2016 and 2018 the line was electrified by Network Rail; this work was delayed due to a number of design, track works and delivery problems. At the same time, platforms were lengthened to accommodate the new four-coach electric Class 710 trains. These trains were intended to be introduced in the spring of 2018, but the delivery was delayed by the manufacturer, the first two entering service on 23 May 2019, with the full fleet entering service in August 2019. Because the delay caused timetable cutbacks and continued overcrowding, TfL offered a month's free travel, financed by the manufacturer Bombardier, to compensate passengers for the months of disruption they experienced.

Extension to Barking Riverside

Proposed in the mid 2010s following cancellation of the DLR extension to Dagenham Dock, the extension was approved in 2017, with construction beginning in late 2018. Running partially alongside the existing London, Tilbury and Southend Railway line and then a new viaduct to the Barking Riverside station, the extension opened to passengers on Monday 18 July 2022 at an estimated cost of £327m.

Accidents and incidents
On 23 January 2020, a freight wagon derailed between Leyton Midland Road and Walthamstow Queens Road stations, causing extensive damage to more than 2.5 miles (4 km) of track; the line was closed between Barking and South Tottenham stations while repair works took place, whereby 10,000 tonnes of ballast, 5,300 concrete sleepers and 39 new pieces of rail were installed. The line re-opened on 19 February 2020.

Current operations
The line carries both goods and passenger traffic. It is owned by Network Rail, with exception of the Barking Riverside branch which is owned by Transport for London. Eleven of its thirteen stations are managed by London Overground; c2c and London Underground manage one each of the remaining two.

Passenger services on the line are operated by Arriva Rail London as part of the London Overground network under contract to TfL. There are four trains per hour in each direction, running from around 06:30–2330 on Monday to Saturday, and around 06:30–22:00 on Sundays. There is a single weekday morning service from Woodgrange Park to Willesden Junction, calling at all intermediate stations except for Gospel Oak.

The line is heavily used by freight as it provides part of an orbital route around London, connecting with many radial routes and the North London Line at Gospel Oak. Freight services are operated by DB Cargo UK, GB Railfreight and Freightliner.

Other services use parts of the line infrequently, or as a diversionary route, but do not stop at most stations:
 c2c operates a few services on the east end of the line through Woodgrange Park
 London Overground runs a single Saturday service timetabled to connect Tottenham South Junction and Seven Sisters on Lea Valley routes passing through, but not calling at, South Tottenham station

The line has an active users' group, "The Barking–Gospel Oak Rail User Group".

Ticketing
Except at the interchange stations, staffed ticket offices were withdrawn by BR in the late 1980s. With operations transferred to London Overground, self-service ticket machines were introduced in November 2007. Oyster- and contactless-card validators (for touching in and out) are at all stations. The ticket machines can be used to load credit onto Oyster cards. Passengers are required to buy tickets, or touch in their Oyster or contactless cards, or else face a penalty fare.

Owing to the lack of ticket barriers and the difficulty of ticket verification when trains are crowded, the line has historically had a high level of fare avoidance. Under Silverlink most stations lacked any ticket purchasing facilities. In theory, passengers could purchase tickets from the conductors on the trains, but it was not always possible to do this. Following the introduction of the current ticketing arrangements, ticketless travel fell from an estimated peak of 40% under Silverlink, to 2% in March 2008.

Passenger volume 
The number of paying passengers has increased very significantly since London Overground assumed the line's management.

This is the passenger volume for the years beginning April 2002 to April 2019.

Notes 

 The large increases in the year beginning April 2006 were partly due to travelcards for National Rail journeys being made from stations that have only a London Underground office and also using a different methodology to estimate likely journeys made from National Rail stations in Zone 1.
 The large increases in the year beginning April 2010 were partly due to Oyster Cards being introduced in January 2010, and new rolling stock.
 Usage of the Gospel Oak to Barking line on the London Overground reduced as a result of engineering works throughout the year. Work included a full closure between October 2016 and February 2017.

Trains

Until 2010 London Overground operated six Class 150 two-coach diesel units on the line. They were replaced by eight Class 172/0 two-coach diesel multiple units (DMUs).

In 2017, all trains were diesel powered as the line was not fully electrified, with only two short sections having overhead electrification, at South Tottenham, to provide a link from Seven Sisters to Stratford, and from the junction with the Great Eastern Main Line to Barking but excluding the bay platform which this service uses. These sections were used only by occasional electric trains on other routes or by goods trains.

Electrification of the line was completed in 2018 but no electric trains were running as there were delays with the new Class 710s. As the leases for the Class 172 came to an end in early 2019, London Overground temporarily shortened three of its Class 378s to run on the line to substitute the Class 172s until the long-delayed Class 710s entered service on 23 May 2019. All of the Class 378s were replaced by 710s by August 2019.

Interchanges 

The line has same-station interchanges with:

 the North London Line at Gospel Oak
 the Victoria line at Blackhorse Road
 the Hammersmith & City line, District line and c2c at Barking.

There are out-of-station interchanges at:
 Harringay Green Lanes to Harringay on the Great Northern Route
 South Tottenham to Seven Sisters on the Seven Sisters Branch of the Lea Valley Lines and the London Underground Victoria line. (Signposting in the street does not indicate the pedestrian/cycle route between the two stations through Stonebridge Road).
 Walthamstow Queens Road to Walthamstow Central on the Chingford branch of the Lea Valley Lines and the London Underground Victoria line. A footpath between the two stations, considerably shortening the foot journey between them, opened on 11 August 2014. While the footpath was first proposed in 1996, works had been delayed due to protracted legal battles over planning permission.
 Wanstead Park to Forest Gate on the Great Eastern Main Line
Woodgrange Park to Manor Park on the Great Eastern Main Line

There are official TfL out-of-station-interchanges, whereby the passenger can continue an unbroken journey between
 Upper Holloway and Archway on the Northern line; and
 Leytonstone High Road and Leytonstone on the Central line .

Two other interchanges are walkable:
 Harringay Green Lanes and Manor House on the Piccadilly line; and
 Crouch Hill and Finsbury Park on the Piccadilly line and Victoria line

Station facilities 

Except at the interchange stations, station facilities are very basic. There are small shelters, information points with recorded service information, information screens and CCTV cameras. Typically there are one or two staff members on duty. Where there are no station buildings they operate out of container-sized portable offices.

Step-free access 

As the trains do not align exactly with the platform height, wheelchair users will probably require assistance to board or leave them.

Vibrations
Residents in Walthamstow complained that vibrations from goods traffic on the line were causing damage to their houses.

Future

Castle Green 

As part of the extension to Barking Riverside, a station, called Castle Green, at Renwick Road on the London, Tilbury & Southend Railway was proposed. Although not built as part of the extension to Barking Riverside, the station site was safeguarded so that it can be built at a later stage.

Potential Abbey Wood extension
Following the plan to extend the line to Barking Riverside, there were also proposals to extend the line further across the river to Abbey Wood via Thamesmead, to allow for easier Orbital journeys in East London, and provide Thamesmead with a railway connection for the first time. This was outlined in the R25 orbital railway proposal in 2014, and the potential of a future extension was mentioned in the inspectors report of the Transport and Works Order authorising the extension to Barking Riverside.

However, in 2019 Transport for London and City Hall proposed an extension of the Docklands Light Railway (DLR) to serve Thamesmead instead of an extension of the Overground, as part of the proposed Thamesmead and Abbey Wood OAPF (Opportunity Area Planning Framework). A DLR extension was chosen due to lower connectivity benefits of an Overground extension, the low frequency (4 trains an hour) of the Gospel Oak to Barking line, and — most significantly — a construction cost twice as much as the DLR, as the gradients required to cross the River Thames would require large scale tunnelling works when compared to the DLR. Despite recommending an extension of the DLR to Thamesmead, the consultation also noted that an extension of the Gospel Oak to Barking line could provide good orbital transport links in the long term.

Other proposed changes 

Local residents and users of the line have proposed adding a station between Leytonstone High Road and Wanstead Park to serve the Cann Hall area. The Leyton and Wanstead branch of the Labour Party has expressed an interest in the proposal. The line's user group and Islington Borough Council have been pressing for the reopening of the station at Junction Road, as its proximity to Tufnell Park Underground station would allow interchange with the Northern line.

References

Further reading

External links

 Tfl press release on North London Railway
 TfL North London Railway plans
 Orbirail North & West London line improvements 
 General rail improvements 
 The Barking-Gospel Oak Rail User Group

London Overground
Transport in the London Borough of Camden
Transport in the London Borough of Islington
Transport in the London Borough of Haringey
Transport in the London Borough of Waltham Forest
Transport in the London Borough of Newham
Transport in the London Borough of Barking and Dagenham
Railway lines in London
Standard gauge railways in England